Elena Fabianovna Gnesina  (sometimes transcribed Gnessina) (Russian Елена Фабиановна Гнесина) (30 May 1874 – 4 June 1967) was a Soviet and Russian composer and music educator, a sister of the composer Mikhail Gnesin.

Gnesina was born in Rostov-on-Don to Rabbi Fabian Osipovich Gnesin (d. 1891) and his wife Bella Isaevna (née Fletzinger), who was a singer and pianist who had studied with Stanisław Moniuszko.
She studied piano at the Moscow Conservatory under Vasily Safonov. She also had lessons from Ferruccio Busoni and Sergei Taneev.  She graduated in 1893.  In 1895 she established, with her sisters Evgenia and Maria, a private music school in Moscow, which became in 1926 the Gnesin State Musical College. Her students included the pianist Lev Oborin and the composer Aram Khachaturian. Amongst the teachers at the school were Mikhail Gnesin and Alexander Gretchaninov. She remained a senior administrator of the college until her death.

Amongst her compositions are piano etudes and works for children, and textbooks on music.

Gnesina's apartment, at  ul. Povarskaya 30/36, Moscow, is maintained as a memorial museum to her.

Gnesina received numerous state awards, including two Orders of Lenin, and recognition as an Honoured Artist of the RSFSR (1935). She died in Moscow in 1967 and is buried in the Novodevichy Cemetery.

References

Sources
 Genova, Anna (2015). "Thee Sisters of the Great Gnessinka", on website of the Russkiy Mir Foundation, (accessed 30 June 2017).
 Zarubin, V. I.(1979). "Gnesina, Elena Fabianova", in the Great Soviet Encyclopedia, 3rd edition. (accessed 30 June 2017)

1874 births
1967 deaths
Musicians from Rostov-on-Don
People from Don Host Oblast
Recipients of the Order of Lenin
Recipients of the Order of the Red Banner of Labour
Russian Jews
Russian women composers
Russian music educators
Russian women classical composers
Russian classical composers
Jewish classical composers
Women music educators
Burials at Novodevichy Cemetery
Composers from the Russian Empire
Soviet composers
Music educators from the Russian Empire